Khadamat va Omran Kish Football Club is an Iranian football club based in Kish, Iran. They compete in Iran Football's 3rd Division.

Season-by-Season

The table below shows the achievements of the club in various competitions.

See also
 Hazfi Cup

Football clubs in Iran
Association football clubs established in 2007
2007 establishments in Iran